Time Is of the Essence is Michael Brecker's sixth album as a leader. It was recorded at the Power Station and Right Track in New York City. The record is notable for guitarist Pat Metheny’s strong presence and three outstanding drummers (on separate tracks), including the legendary Elvin Jones.

Track listing 
All tracks composed by Michael Brecker; except where indicated

Personnel
Michael Brecker – tenor saxophone
Pat Metheny – guitar
Larry Goldings – organ
Elvin Jones – drums (tracks 1, 4, 9)
Jeff "Tain" Watts – drums (tracks 2, 5, 7)
Bill Stewart – drums (tracks 3, 6, 8)

References

1999 albums
Verve Records albums
Michael Brecker albums